Ustad Imam Din Gujrati (15 April 1870 - 22 February 1954) was a Pakistani humorous poet of Urdu and Punjabi language.

Imam Din Gujarati was born on April 15, 1870, in Gujarat, British India (now Pakistan). His real name was Imam-ud-Din. His education was only up to 'primary school' which is also called 'elementary school' in some parts of the world. He was employed in Chongi, Gujarat Revenue Department.

Imam Din Gujarati's speech has a unique place in Urdu and Punjabi poetry. At first he continued to write Punjabi poetry but later on at the insistence of his close friend and poet and journalist Rahat Malik's elder brother Malik Abdul Rehman Khadim, he also started reciting poetry in Urdu.

Since he did not have a queen in Urdu language, he invented his own style for his poetry by mixing Urdu and Punjabi language which was very popular then and is very popular even today. Imam Din has gained a lot of fame by adopting Gujarati style.

Authorship 
His collections were published under the names of Bang Dahl, Bang Raheel and Sur Israfil. He also authored a book, The Principal of Poetry.

Death 
Imam Din Gujrati died on February 22, 1954, in Gujarat, Pakistan.

References 

People from Gujrat District
Punjabi-language poets
Pakistani Muslims
Urdu-language poets from Pakistan
20th-century Pakistani poets
People from British India
1954 deaths
1870 births